Lake Waconia is a lake located within the city limits of Waconia in Carver County, Minnesota in the United States.

Waconia is derived from a Sioux-language word meaning "fountain" or "spring".

References

lakes of Carver County, Minnesota